The 1967–68 Honduran Segunda División was the second season of the Honduran Segunda División.  Under the management of Víctor Bernárdez, C.D. Victoria won the tournament after defeating C.D. Federal in the final series and obtained promotion to the 1968–69 Honduran Liga Nacional.

Final

 Victoria won 8–5 on aggregate.

References

Segunda
1967